The SMU Mustangs women's soccer program represents Southern Methodist University in National Collegiate Athletics Association (NCAA) Division I. The Mustangs compete in the American Athletic Conference (The American) and play their home games on SMU's campus in Dallas, Texas at Westcott Field.

History
The SMU women's soccer program played their first season in 1986 under the direction of head coach Alan Kirkup. The Mustangs made their first NCAA Tournament appearance in 1990.

The Southwest Conference sponsored women's soccer in 1995, and in that season the Mustangs advanced to the NCAA Final Four after winning both the SWC regular season and tournament championships.

SMU joined the Western Athletic Conference in 1996, and Greg Ryan took over the program. The Mustangs returned to the NCAA Tournament in 1997, and won the regular season conference title in all three of Ryan's seasons at SMU.

George Van Linder was named head coach in 1999, and SMU continued their success with three NCAA Tournament appearances and three regular season conference championships in Van Linder's four seasons.

John Cossaboon took control as head coach in 2003, and SMU returned to the NCAA Tournament again in both 2003 and 2004. The Mustangs also won both the WAC regular season and tournament championships in their final two seasons in the WAC.

In the nine seasons SMU competed in the WAC, the Mustangs advanced to the NCAA Tournament six times. The Mustangs also won the conference regular season championship eight times and the conference postseason tournament championship six times.

SMU joined Conference USA in 2005, and the Mustangs continued their success with two more appearances in the NCAA Tournament as well as two more regular season conference championships under the direction of Cossaboon.

Two-time National Coach Of The Year Chris Petrucelli was named head coach of SMU in 2012. The Mustangs joined The American Athletic Conference in 2013.

Stadium
The Mustangs play their home games at Westcott Field on the campus of SMU.  The soccer field is natural grass and measures  x . However, the field will be renovated and renamed to the Washburne Soccer and Track Stadium.

Notable former players

 Danielle Fotopoulous (Garrett) (1994–1995)
 Marci Jobson (Miller) (1996–1997)
 Erin McLeod (2000–2001)
 Vanessa Valadez (2014–2018)
 Claire Oats (2014–2017)
 Allie Thorton (2016–2019)

Coaches

Seasons

See also
 SMU Mustangs
 SMU Mustangs men's soccer

References

External links
 SMU Women's Soccer Home Page

 
NCAA Division I women's soccer teams
Soccer clubs in Texas